The Burmese kinship system is  a fairly complex system used to define family in the Burmese language. In the Burmese kinship system:
Maternal and parental lineages are not distinguished, except for members of the parents' generations.
Relative age of a sibling relation is considered.
Gender of the relative is distinguished.
Generation from ego is indicated.

History
Many of the kinship terms used in Burmese today are extant or derived from Old Burmese. These include the terms used to reference siblings and in-laws.

Grades of kinship
The Burmese kinship system identifies and recognizes six generations of direct ancestors, excluding the ego:

Be - great-grandfather's great-grandfather (6 generations removed)
Bin - great-grandfather's grandfather (5 generations removed)
Bi - great-grandfather's father (4 generations removed)
Bay - great-grandfather (3 generations removed)
Pho - grandfather (2 generations removed)
Phay - father (1 generation removed)

The Burmese kinship system identifies seven generations of direct descendants, excluding the ego:
Tha - (1 generation removed)
Myi - (2 generations removed)
Myit - (3 generations removed)
Ti - (4 generations removed)
Tut or Hmyaw - (5 generations removed)
Kyut - (6 generations removed)
Hset - (7 generations removed)

Extended family and terminology
Kinship terms differ depending on the degree of formality, courtesy or intimacy. Also, there are regional differences in the terms used.

Common suffixes
female:  (ma)
male:  (hpa)

Burmese also possesses kin numeratives (in the form of suffixes):
second youngest:  (lat)

Relationships
The Burmese kinship system also recognizes various relationships between family members that are not found in English, including:
 (tu ayi) - relationship between uncle or aunt and nephew or niece
 (khami khamet) - relationship between parents of a married couple
 (maya nyi-ako) - relationship between the husbands of two sisters
 (thami myauk tha) - relationship between cousins, used in Arakanese language

Members of the nuclear family

Members of the extended family

References

Kinship terminology
Burmese culture
Burmese language